Holy Presentation Church is an Orthodox church in Beryslav, Ukraine. Its original name was the Resurrection Church. It is an 18th-century building constructed in 1725 of oak; the roof is made of iron. In 1784, the church was transported by the Cossacks along the Dnipro River from the Zaporizhian Perevolochna fortress to Beryslav. From 1939 to 1941, the church was closed. Today, the religious building belongs to the Ukrainian Orthodox Church (Moscow Patriarchate) community.

History 
In 1725, the church was built as a military church in the Cossack fortress Perevolochna in Poltava province (guberniia) (now Dnipro Region), on the border of Zaporizhian Sich. It was located 350 kilometers from where it currently stands.

At the beginning of the 15th century, these lands (now Beryslav Raion) were the southern borders of the Grand Duchy of Lithuania. There was a custom known as Vitovtova. There was a Dnipro River ferry, Tavanskyi pereviz, which got its name from the Tavan Island. In 1689, during the Crimean campaign, the Russian Army under the command of knyaz N. Golitsyn unsuccessfully tried to capture the fortress. Only in 1695, after a long siege by Russian troops, together with Zaporizhian Cossacks, was Kyzy-Kermen captured and these lands passed to the Russian Empire.

In 1784, the Cossacks rafted the church over the Dnipro River to Kyzy-Kermen, which in the same year received the status of the city and was named Beryslav. According to legend, on the raft on which the Church was transported, there was an inscription: "take and glorify". The name of the city comes from that phrase.

"At that time by decree of Empress Catherine II began settling in the South of Ukraine, and people from Poltava took with them this shrine - said priest Alexander. - There are two versions of its delivering. According to the first, the whole Church was rafted along the Dnipro River, but in that case it would have remained only chips. Therefore, the second version is more reliable, according to which the Church was first took apart, then all parts were numbered, rafted, and then they were reassembled without a single nail on a new place..."

There is a legend among the citizens of Beryslav that the Holy Presentation Church was washed away by spring flooding and sailed down the river straight to the city.

This is a rare case in the history of Ukrainian architecture, but the oldest building in the city is older than Beryslav itself by more than half a century.

After delivery, the church was put in the historic center of the city, on the place of the current People's Hall (House of Culture), and consecrated in honor of the Resurrection of Christ (Easter). In 1853, in the midst of the Crimean War, for an unknown reason, the church was moved outside of Beryslav, to the place where the Presentation cemetery was founded. The church itself was re-consecrated in honor of the Presentation of the Blessed Virgin Mary. At the former place was built a majestic church, which was later demolished by the Soviet regime.

In the first half of the 20th century the Holy Presentation Church was closed, like all other Orthodox shrines. Right before the beginning of the Second World War, there was even a proposal to disassemble it for firewood and burn it: trees were very rare in the steppe areas.

"But God kept this Holy place," said the priest, "and spiritual life in the Church was renewed only with the arrival of the Germans in 1941. They miraculously found the surviving priest Daniil, who had a broken spine, and literally forced him to resume church service."

Now Holy Presentation Church is a protected architectural monument from the 18th century.

Architecture 

The church was built in a style typical for folk architecture. It is one of the few extant examples of Zaporizhian Cossack wooden architecture.

The church belongs to the cross-domed type, has a longitudinal-axial composition; with the main volume being octagonal and the apse pentagonal. To the main volume from the north, south and west are attached faceted porches.

The church is single-domed, crowned with an unusual – similar to Tatar – polygonal spherical dome with a small onion dome. The church is painted in bright blue with green accents. The material used came from oak logs, which was vertically covered with boards, set on a stone foundation, and covered with iron.

The central window above the main entrance has a cross-like shape. Concrete steps lead to the main door. The entire height of the church is 17 meters.

References 

 Свято-Введенская церковь(Берислав)
 Церковь Введения во храм Пресвятой Богородицы в городе Берислав(1726)
 Введенская церковь

Ukrainian Orthodox Church (Moscow Patriarchate) church buildings
Buildings and structures in Kherson Oblast
Churches in Ukraine
Buildings and structures completed in 1725